Luciano Vera (born 9 February 2002) is an Argentine footballer who plays for Deportivo Maipú as a defender.

Club career

DAC Dunajská Streda
Vera made his professional Fortuna Liga debut for Dunajská Streda in match against Spartak Trnava on 22 May 2021.

References

External links
 FC DAC 1904 Dunajská Streda official club profile 
 Futbalnet profile 
 
 

2002 births
Living people
Sportspeople from Misiones Province
Argentine footballers
Argentine expatriate footballers
Association football defenders
FC DAC 1904 Dunajská Streda players
Deportivo Maipú players
Slovak Super Liga players
2. Liga (Slovakia) players
Expatriate footballers in Slovakia
Argentine expatriate sportspeople in Slovakia